The Hyracodontidae are an extinct family of rhinoceroses endemic to North America, Europe, and Asia during the Eocene through early Oligocene, living from 48.6 to 26.3 million years ago (Mya), existing about .

The Hyracodontidae thrived in the rainforests of Kazakhstan, Pakistan, and southwest China, a former coastal region. Fossil evidence also extends their geographical range to Germany, as well as to Mongolia.

References

Further reading

 Lucas, S. G. & Sobus, J. C., (1989), The Systematics of Indricotheres. 358–378 in Prothero, D. R. & Schoch, R. M., (eds.) 1989: The Evolution of Perissodactyls, Oxford University Press, New York, New York & Oxford, England.

Prehistoric rhinoceroses
Oligocene odd-toed ungulates
Rupelian extinctions
Prehistoric mammals of North America
Prehistoric mammals of Europe
Prehistoric mammals of Asia
Eocene first appearances
Prehistoric mammal families